The International Correspondence Chess Federation national member federations number 56 nations, divided into four geographical zones:

Zone 1: Europe (35 countries)
World Zone (16 countries)
Zone 4: Africa/Asia (5 countries)

Zone 1: Europe
Zonal Director: Andrey Pavlikov (RUS)

World Zone
Zonal Director: Jason Bokar (USA)

Zone 4: Africa/Asia
Zonal Director: Everdinand Knol (RSA)

References

External links
International Correspondence Chess Federation web site

Correspondence chess organizations
Regional ICCF organizations